Bishopstown railway station was on the Cork and Macroom Direct Railway in County Cork, Ireland.

History

The station opened on 1 May 1912. Regular passenger services were withdrawn on 1 July 1921.

Routes

Further reading

References

Disused railway stations in County Cork
Railway stations opened in 1912
Railway stations closed in 1921
1912 establishments in Ireland
Railway stations in the Republic of Ireland opened in the 20th century